José González (born 21 February 1907, date of death unknown) was a Spanish sports shooter. He competed in the 25 m rapid fire pistol event at the 1932 Summer Olympics.

References

External links
 

1907 births
Year of death missing
Spanish male sport shooters
Olympic shooters of Spain
Shooters at the 1932 Summer Olympics
People from Zamora, Spain
Sportspeople from the Province of Zamora
20th-century Spanish people